Nathalia Edenmont, née Nathalie Nicole Edenmont, (born 7 February 1970 in Yalta, Soviet Union) is a Swedish-Ukrainian photo-based artist who moved to Sweden and Stockholm in 1991. Edenmont studied art, music and balette at an art school for children at Jalta in the Crimea. Both her parents died while she was a teenager but she continued to study in a Kiev state school for artists and also studied at Simferopol. She moved to Stockholm in 1991, and studied graphic design at Forsbergs skola. While Edenmont paints portraits of people in a style reminiscent of classical paintings, she is better known for her use of dead animals and animal parts in her photographs. She has had exhibitions in London, New York, Berlin and Moscow.

Edenmont presented an episode of the Sveriges Radio show Sommar i P1 on 23 June 2014.

References

External links
Nathalia Edenmont's website

1970 births
Living people
People from Yalta
20th-century Swedish women artists
21st-century Swedish women artists